Ficus scabra is a fig species in the family Moraceae native to Fiji, New Caledonia, Niue, Samoa, Tonga, Vanuatu, and Wallis-Futuna Island in the southwestern Pacific.

References 

scabra